Kleinenbroich station is a through station in the town of Korschenbroich in the German state of North Rhine-Westphalia. The station was opened on 17 January 1853 on the Mönchengladbach–Düsseldorf railway opened between Mönchengladbach and Neuss by the Aachen-Düsseldorf-Ruhrort Railway Company on 16 December 1852. It has two platform tracks and it is classified by Deutsche Bahn as a category 5 station.

The station is served by Rhine-Ruhr S-Bahn lines S 8 between Mönchengladbach and Wuppertal-Oberbarmen or Hagen every 20 minutes.

References

S8 (Rhine-Ruhr S-Bahn)
Rhine-Ruhr S-Bahn stations
Railway stations in Germany opened in 1853
1853 establishments in Prussia
Buildings and structures in Rhein-Kreis Neuss